East Point is an unincorporated community in Red River Parish, Louisiana, United States.

The private K-12 school, Riverdale Academy (established 1970), is located in East Point.

References

Unincorporated communities in Red River Parish, Louisiana
Unincorporated communities in Louisiana
Populated places in Ark-La-Tex